The Battle of Cherbourg was part of the Battle of Normandy during World War II. It was fought immediately after the successful Allied landings on 6 June 1944. Allied troops, mainly American, isolated and captured the fortified port, which was considered vital to the campaign in Western Europe, in a hard-fought, month-long campaign.

Allied plans
When they drew up their plans for the invasion of France, the Allied staff considered that it would be necessary to secure a deep-water port to allow reinforcements to be brought directly from the United States. (Without such a port, equipment packed for transit would first have to be unloaded at a port in Great Britain, unpacked, waterproofed and then reloaded onto landing craft to be transferred to France). Cherbourg, at the end of the Cotentin Peninsula, was the largest port accessible from the landings.

The Allied planners decided at first not to land directly on the Cotentin Peninsula, since this sector would be separated from the main Allied landings by the Douve river valley, which had been flooded by the Germans to deter airborne landings. On being appointed overall land commander for the invasion in January 1944, British Army General Bernard Montgomery reinstated the landing on the Cotentin peninsula, partly to widen the front and therefore prevent the invaders becoming sealed into a narrow lodgement, but also to enable a rapid capture of Cherbourg.

Landings

In the early hours of 6 June paratroopers (the US 82nd and 101st Airborne Divisions) landed at the base of the Cotentin Peninsula. Although the landings were scattered, they nevertheless secured most of the routes by which the US VII Corps would advance from Utah Beach. The US 4th Infantry Division landed on Utah Beach shortly after dawn with few casualties.

In the immediate aftermath of the landings the priority for the invasion forces at Utah Beach was to link up with the main Allied landings further east. On 9 June the 101st Airborne Division managed to cross the Douve river valley and captured Carentan the next day. After vicious house-to-house fighting during the Battle of Carentan, the airborne troops were able to take the town, ensuring the Allies a continuous front. The front was maintained despite a German counterattack reinforced by armored units on the 13th, known as the Battle of Bloody Gulch.

Move across the Cotentin Peninsula

This success allowed VII Corps to advance westwards to cut off the Cotentin Peninsula. An additional three infantry divisions had landed to reinforce the Corps. Major General J. Lawton Collins, the Corps Commander, drove his troops hard, replacing units in the front lines or sacking officers if progress was slow.

The Germans facing VII Corps were a mix of regiments and battlegroups from several divisions, many of which had already suffered heavy casualties fighting the American airborne troops in the first days of the landings. Very few German armored or mobile troops could be sent to this part of the front because of the threat to Caen further east. Infantry reinforcements arrived only slowly. Tactically, the Germans' flooding of the Douve worked against them because it secured the Allied southern flank.

By 16 June there were no further natural obstacles in front of the American forces. The German command was in some confusion. Erwin Rommel and other commanders wished to withdraw their troops in good order into the Atlantic Wall fortifications of Cherbourg, where they could have withstood a siege for some time. Adolf Hitler demanded that they hold their present lines even though this risked disaster.

Late on 17 June Hitler agreed that the troops might withdraw but specified that they were to occupy a new, illogical defensive line, spanning the entire peninsula just south of Cherbourg. Rommel protested against this order, but he nevertheless relieved General Wilhelm Fahrmbacher, commanding the LXXXIV Corps, who he thought was trying to circumvent it.

Assault on Cherbourg

On 18 June the US 9th Infantry Division reached the west coast of the peninsula, isolating the Cherbourg garrison from any potential reinforcements. Within 24 hours, the 4th Infantry, 9th and 79th Infantry Divisions were driving north on a broad front. There was little opposition on the western side of the peninsula and on the eastern side, and the exhausted defenders around Montebourg collapsed. Several large caches of V-1 flying bombs were discovered by the Americans in addition to a V-2 rocket installation at Brix.

In two days, the American divisions were within striking distance of Cherbourg. The garrison commander, Lieutenant General Karl-Wilhelm von Schlieben, had 21,000 men but many of these were hastily drafted naval personnel or from labour units. The fighting troops who had retreated to Cherbourg (including the remnants of von Schlieben's own division, the 709th), were tired and disorganised. Food, fuel and ammunition were short. The Luftwaffe dropped a few supplies, but these were mostly items such as Iron Crosses, intended to bolster the garrison's morale. Nevertheless, von Schlieben rejected a summons to surrender and began carrying out demolitions to deny the port to the Allies.

Collins launched a general assault on 22 June. Resistance was stiff at first, but the Americans slowly cleared the Germans from their bunkers and concrete pillboxes. Allied naval ships bombarded fortifications near the city on 25 June. On 26 June, the British elite force No. 30 Commando also known as 30 Assault Unit launched an assault on Octeville – a suburb to the south west of Cherbourg. This was the location of the Kriegsmarine naval intelligence HQ at Villa Meurice which the Commandos captured along with 20 officers and 500 men. On the same day the 79th Division captured Fort du Roule, which dominated the city and its defenses. This finished any organised defense. Von Schlieben was captured. The harbor fortifications and the arsenal surrendered on 29 June, after a ruse by Allied officers, Captain Blazzard and Colonel Teague, who convinced the German officers to surrender the peninsula, bluffing about their manpower and ordnance. Some German troops cut off outside the defenses held out until 1 July.

Aftermath

The Germans had so thoroughly wrecked and mined the port of Cherbourg  that Hitler awarded the Knight's Cross to Rear Admiral Walter Hennecke the day after he surrendered for "a feat unprecedented in the annals of coastal defense." The port was not brought into limited use until the middle of August, although the first ships were able to use the harbor in late July. Nevertheless, the Germans had suffered a major defeat as a result of a rapid Allied build up on their western flank and Hitler's rigid orders. General Friedrich Dollmann, commanding the German Seventh Army, died on 28 June, having just been informed of a court martial pending as a result of the capture of Cherbourg, reportedly from a heart attack but possibly by suicide by poisoning.

Footnotes

References

 
 Wilmot, Chester. The Struggle for Europe, Hertfordshire, United Kingdom: Wordsworth Editions Limited, 1997. .

Further reading

External links

 History of War, Cherbourg, 1944

1944 in France
Operation Overlord
Battles of World War II involving Germany
Battles of World War II involving the United States
Land battles of World War II involving the United Kingdom
Battle of Cherbourg
June 1944 events